The Judicial Yuan is the judicial branch of the government of the Republic of China on Taiwan. It runs a Constitutional Court and oversees all systems of courts of Taiwan, including ordinary courts like the supreme court, high courts, district courts as well as special courts like administrative courts and disciplinary courts. By Taiwanese law, the Judicial Yuan holds the following powers:
 Interpretation – Constitutional Court interprets the Constitution and other statutes and regulations by either the central government or local governments.
 Adjudicate – Most civil, criminal, and administrative cases are adjudicated by the respective courts supervised by the Judicial Yuan. The Constitutional Court adjudicate Presidential impeachment and political party dissolution cases.
 Discipline – Disciplinary measures with respect to public functionaries are adjudicated by the Disciplinary court.
 Judicial Administration – The Judicial Yuan supervises all courts established by Taiwanese law.

According to the current Constitution, the Constitutional Court comprises 15 justices. One justice acts as the President of the court, and another acts as the Vice President. All justices, including the President and Vice President, are  appointed by the President of the Republic with the consent of the Legislative Yuan. Upon appointment justices have a term limit of eight years, but this term limit does not apply to the President and Vice President.

Constitutional Court

History
Before the 1980s, the impact of the Constitutional Court was limited by authoritarian governance. The Court can be seen as an instrument of the Kuomintang regime. It never accepted a case on the constitutionality of the Temporary Provisions, which were the basis of authoritarian rule; The Court declined to hear challenges to these Provisions, and issued a number of decisions that facilitated Kuomintang rule within the confines of at least nominal constitutionalism. For the most part, the court served as a legal advisor to the government, rendering decisions that unified interpretations of statutes or ordinances or providing legitimacy for these politically expedient solutions as a result of extension of legislative representatives' terms. In Interpretation No 31 of 1954, the court extended the legislative representatives' terms, ruling that 'the nation was under crisis and the country could not hold the election for the second term legally'. In the 1960s and 1970s, the Constitutional Court further affirmed the constitutionality of adding extra seats to both the Legislative Yuan and the National Assembly by means of legislative enactments in Interpretation Nos 117 and 150.

Prior to the 1980s, the Constitutional Court rarely asserted itself as the guardian of the Constitution; on rare occasions, however, the court nevertheless risked undermining its own institutional authority by standing in opposition to other branches of government. In Interpretation No 86 of 1960, the court held that the law that allowed the Ministry of Justice to supervise the lower courts was inconsistent with the constitution and required all courts to be placed under the Judicial Yuan. However, this decision was ignored by the government, and the impugned law was not revised until 1980.

After the succession of Lee Teng-hui as President in 1987, however, the Court gradually became more active. It began to strike administrative actions that were vague or delegated too much power to the executive branch. Amongst its decisions, the Court ended the ban on rallies advocating secessionism or communism as a violation of free speech, allowed universities to refuse to allow military "counselors", whose presence in dorms had formerly been mandatory, and allowed teachers to form a union outside the "official" union structure. Constitutional amendments in 1992 provided for the Court to hear challenges against "unconstitutional" political parties, defined as those whose "goals or activities jeopardize the existence of the ROC or a free democratic constitutional order."

Amidst the divided government between 2000 and 2008, the Constitutional Court became a primary political mediator of highly charged political disputes; it adopted a 'dialectic approach' in facilitation of political dialogues. For example, in a constitutional dispute concerning the suspension of the construction of a nuclear power plant, the Court held that the Democratic Progressive Party-led Executive Yuan should negotiate with the Kuomintang-dominated Legislative Yuan to resolve the issue. The unity of the executive and legislative branches since 2008 has seen a decline in the number of politically high-profile cases entering into the Constitutional Court's docket. At the same time, the number of individuals' petitions challenging legislative or executive acts on grounds of violation of constitutional rights continued to rise steadily, and the Constitutional Court has responded to these rights challenges with a high number of declarations of unconstitutionality.

Functions

The Constitutional Court, also previously known as the Council of Grand Justices, provides rulings on the following six categories of cases: 
 Constitutionality of laws and constitutional complaints (Chapter III cases);
 Disputes between constitutional organs (Chapter IV cases);
 Impeachment of the President and the Vice President (Chapter V cases);
 Dissolution of unconstitutional political parties (Chapter VI cases);
 Local self-government (Chapter VII cases); and
 Uniform interpretation of statutes and regulations (Chapter VIII cases).

A petition to declare regulations or laws unconstitutional (Chapter III cases) shall be filed in the following circumstances:
 A highest state organ which, in the exercise of its powers or on account of its subordinate agency's exercise of powers, considers that the applicable law is in contravention of the Constitution may lodge a petition with the Constitutional Court for a judgment declaring the impugned law unconstitutional. A subordinate agency which, in the exercise of its powers, considers that the applicable law is in contravention of the Constitution may request its superior agency to lodge the petition;
 A quarter or more of the incumbent Legislators who, in the exercise of their powers, believe that the relevant statutory law is in contravention of the Constitution may lodge a petition with the Constitutional Court for a judgment declaring the impugned statutory law unconstitutional;
 A court which strongly believes, on reasonable grounds, that an applicable statutory law on whose validity depends the court's decision of a pending case is in contravention of the Constitution may lodge a petition with the Constitutional Court for a judgment declaring the impugned applicable law unconstitutional; or
 After exhaustion of all ordinary judicial remedies, any person who believes that a final court decision that finds against her or him or a legal provision applied in such a court decision contravenes the Constitution may lodge a petition with the Constitutional Court for a judgment declaring the decision or the impugned legal provision unconstitutional.

Justices
There are in total of 15 justices serving in the Constitutional Court, current members are:

Important decisions
Important decisions of the Constitutional Court are listed as the following.

Interpretations made before the Constitutional Court Procedure Act

Interpretation No. 31
In 1954, the Council of Grand Justices extended the terms of members of the Legislative Yuan and the Control Yuan elected in 1948, ruling that:

As a result of the Council’s ruling, first-term members of the Legislative and Control Yuans continued to serve for the next four decades until 1992, resulting in distortions of representation. Following the death of some of those representatives, the Temporary Provisions against the Communist Rebellion were amended to allow vacancies to be filled by holding supplementary elections or by adding more seats for representatives elected locally in Taiwan.

Interpretation No. 261
The Council of Grand Justices issued interpretation No. 261 on June 21, 1990. The Council of Grand Justices ruled on the constitutionality of the continued sitting in the National Assembly of members elected on the mainland in 1948 and ordered that: 

The court further required the government to hold a nationwide second-term election of the national representatives including a certain number of representatives-at-large for the proper functioning of the constitutional system.

Interpretation No. 499
The Constitutional Court, in voiding the 5th amendment of the Additional Articles of the Constitution, developed criteria by which the constitutionality of a constitutional amendment should be judged:
 a constitutional amendment must be enacted in accordance with constitutional due process; and
 since a constitutional amendment is enacted on the basis of powers bestowed by the constitution, it cannot alter ‘the existing constitutional provisions of essential significance, such as the principle of the democratic republic, the principle of sovereignty of and by the people, the core contents of fundamental rights of people, and the principle of checks and balances of governmental powers.’

Judgements made after the Constitutional Court Procedure Act

Ordinary courts

Supreme court 

The Supreme Court is the court of last resort for civil and criminal cases. A civil case can be appealed to the Supreme Court only when more than NT $1,500,000 is at stake. Except for petty offences enumerated in Article 376 of the Code of Criminal Procedure, any criminal case may be appealed to the Court.

This Court exercises jurisdiction over the following cases:
appeals from judgments of High Courts or their branches as courts of first instance in criminal cases;
appeals from judgments of High Courts or their branches as courts of second instance in civil and criminal cases;
appeals from rulings of High Courts or their branches;
appeals from judgments or rulings rendered by the civil court of second instance by the summary procedure, the amounts in controversy exceeding NT $1,500,000, and with permission granted in accordance with specified provisions;
civil and criminal retrials within the jurisdiction of the court of third instance;
extraordinary appeals; or
any other case as specified by laws.

High court 

There are six High Court branches in Taiwan:

The High Courts and its branches exercise jurisdiction over the following cases:
 Appeals from judgments of the District Courts or their branches as courts of the first instance in ordinary proceedings of civil and criminal cases;
 Interlocutory appeals from rulings of the District Courts or their branches in ordinary proceedings;
 First instance criminal cases relating to rebellion, treason, and offenses against friendly relations with foreign states;
 Military appellate cases whose judgments are imprisonment for a definite period rendered by the High Military Courts and their branches; and
 Other cases prescribed by law.

The High Courts and its Branch Courts are divided into civil, criminal and specialized divisions. Each Division is composed of one Division Chief Judge and two Associate Judges. Additionally, the High Court and its Branch Courts have a Clerical Bureau, which is headed by a Chief Clerk who assists the President with administrative affairs.

Cases before the High Courts or its Branch Courts are heard and decided by a panel of three judges. However, one of the judges may conduct preparatory proceedings.

The Court has seven civil courts, each of which has one presiding judge and three judges to handle civil appeals of the second instance and counter-appeal cases under the system of collegial panels, but they do not deal with simple litigation.  The Court has eleven criminal courts, each of which has one presiding judge and two or three judges to handle criminal appeals of the second instance and counter-appeal cases under the system of collegial panels as well as litigation of the first instance concerning civil strife, foreign aggression or violation of foreign relations.  Based on various needs, the Court manages several professional courts such as the Professional Court of Fair Trade Cases, Family Professional Court, Professional Court of International Trade, Maritime Professional Court, Professional Court of State Compensation, Professional Court of Anti-corruption, Professional Court of Intellectual Property Rights, Professional Court of Juvenile Delinquency, Professional Court of Serious Criminal Cases, Professional Court of Public Security, Professional Court of Fair Trade Act, Professional Court of Sexual Harassment, etc.

District court 

There are currently 22 District Courts in Taiwan:

Each District Court may establish one or more summary divisions for the adjudication of cases suitable for summary judgment. The civil summary procedure is for cases involving an amount in controversy of not more than 300,000 New Taiwan dollar and for simple legal disputes. Currently there are a total of 45 divisions in Taiwan. Additionally, there is a Taiwan Kaohsiung Juvenile Court, established in accordance with the Law Governing the Disposition of Juvenile Cases.

Each of the District Courts has civil, criminal and summary divisions and may establish specialized divisions to handle cases involving juveniles, family, traffic, and labor matters as well as motions to set aside rulings on violations of the Statute for the Maintenance of Social Order. Each division has a Division Chief Judge who supervises and assigns the business of the division. Each District Court has a Public Defenders' Office and a Probation Officers' Office.

A single judge hears and decides cases in ordinary and summary proceedings as well as in small claims cases. A panel of three judges decides cases of great importance in ordinary proceedings as well as appeals or interlocutory appeals from the summary and small claims proceedings. Criminal cases are decided by a panel of three judges, with the exception of summary proceedings which may be held by a single judge. The Juvenile Court hears and decides only cases involving juveniles.

Special courts

Administrative court
The administrative courts handle cases regarding administrative litigation. The current administrative litigation system adopts a "Two Level Two Instance System" litigation procedure.  The administrative courts are classified into the High Administrative Court, which is the court of first instance, and the Supreme Administrative Court, which is the appellate court.  The first instance of the High Administrative Court is a trial of facts.  The Supreme Administrative Court is an appellate court.

Intellectual Property and Commercial Court
The Intellectual Property and Commercial Court handles cases regarding intellectual properties and commerce.

Disciplinary court
The disciplinary court maintains official discipline and punishes public servants, regardless of rank or appointment, for violations of the law or negligence in his or her duty in accordance with Article 77 of the Constitution.

Judges 
Article 80 of the Constitution states that Judges shall be above partisanship and shall, in accordance with law, hold trials independently, free from any interference. Furthermore, Article 81 states that Judges shall hold office for life. No judge shall be removed from office unless he has been guilty of a criminal offense or subjected to disciplinary measure, or declared to be under interdiction. No judge shall, except in accordance with law, be suspended or transferred or have his salary reduced. Judges shall be appointed from those persons who have passed the Examination of Judicial Officials, completed the Training Course for Judicial Officials and possessed distinguished records after a term of practice.

President and Vice President of Judicial Yuan 

Since a constitutional amendment ratified in 1997, the President and Vice President of the Judicial Yuan need to be justices. However, they are not subject to the 8-year term limit like the other 13 justices. In the current constitution, the President and Vice President of the Judicial Yuan shall be nominated by the President of Taiwan and approved by the Legislative Yuan (the parliament of Taiwan).

Before 1947 Constitution

1947 Constitution

1997 Constitution amendment

See also 

 Additional Articles of the Constitution of the Republic of China
 Constitution of the Republic of China
 Six Codes
 Law of Taiwan
 Law schools in Taiwan
 Supreme Court of the Republic of China
 High Court (Taiwan)
 District Court (Taiwan)
 Ministry of Justice (Taiwan)
 Supreme Prosecutors Office
 Taiwan High Prosecutors Office

References

External links 

 The Judicial Yuan
 The Ministry of Justice
 Taiwan Law Resources
 Official Website of the Supreme Court of ROC

 
Taiwan
Constitutional courts
Courts and tribunals established in 1928
1928 establishments in China
Law of Taiwan